Lekh Raj Bhatta is a Nepalese politician, belonging to the CPN (UML). Bhatta is the former member of Constituent Assembly. Bhatta is the secretary of CPN (UML).

Political life 
He also served as Minister for Labour and Transport in First Dahal cabinet and Minister of Industry, Commerce and Supplies in Second Oli cabinet .In the 2008 Constituent Assembly election he was elected from the Kailali-5 constituency, winning 17979 votes. Again he served as Member of constituent Assembly in 2013 from Kailali-5. He was the former Member of House of Representatives elected from kailali-5.

Personal life 
He was born on March 24, 1960. His father name was Dasharath Bhatt and Mother Name is Durga Devi Bhatta.

Political career 
Bhatta joined politics in 1973  and took the membership of Nepal Communist Party (Fourth Convention) led by Mohan Bikram Singh in 1976. He later joined CPN (Masaal) and CPN (Unity Center) to finally become a full-time member of CPN-Maoist in 1995. He went on to become central member in 2001 and politburo member. He was jailed for six months during the armed conflict launched by CPN-Maoist.

In the CA Election 2008, Bhatta was elected from Kailali-5 with 17,979 votes. His closest opponent Dirgha Raj Bhatta (NC) received 13,638 votes while Hari Shankar Yogi (CPN-UML) got 7,597 votes to come in third position.

Bhatta was appointed as Labor Minister in the government led by Pushpa Kamal Dahal 'Prachanda'. He looked after the Ministry for Commerce and Supplies in the government led by Dr. Baburam Bhattarai.
Now He is the standing committee member of Nepal Communist Party

See also 
 2021 split in Communist Party of Nepal (Maoist Centre)

References

Communist Party of Nepal (Unified Marxist–Leninist) politicians
Living people
Communist Party of Nepal (Maoist Centre) politicians
Nepalese atheists
People from Doti District
1960 births
Nepal MPs 2017–2022
Nepal Communist Party (NCP) politicians

Members of the 1st Nepalese Constituent Assembly